Pachygrontha antennata is a species of pentatomomorphan bug in the family Pachygronthidae, found mainly in Korea and Japan.

Subspecies
These two subspecies belong to the species Pachygrontha antennata:
 Pachygrontha antennata antennata (Uhler, 1860)
 Pachygrontha antennata nigriventris Reuter, 1881

References

External links

 

Lygaeoidea